Parliamentary elections were held in Iceland on 5 July 1942. Although the Independence Party won a plurality of votes, the Progressive Party remained as the largest party in the Lower House of the Althing, winning 14 of the 33 seats.

Following the election, changes were made to the electoral system that reduced the over-representation of the Progressive Party. Early elections were held in October.

Results

References

1942 07
Iceland
Parliament
Iceland